Andrzej Bławdzin (born 19 August 1938) is a former Polish cyclist. He competed at the 1964 Summer Olympics and the 1968 Summer Olympics. He won the Tour de Pologne 1967.

References

External links
 

1938 births
Living people
Polish male cyclists
Olympic cyclists of Poland
Cyclists at the 1964 Summer Olympics
Cyclists at the 1968 Summer Olympics
People from Warsaw West County
Sportspeople from Masovian Voivodeship